"Turn Around" is a song by British singer Conor Maynard from his debut studio album, Contrast. The song features vocals from American singer  Ne-Yo. It was released as the album's third single as a digital download on 11 October 2012. The song was produced by Stargate and Benny Blanco, who also co-wrote it with Ne-Yo. This is another collaboration between StarGate and Benny Blanco, following such songs as Wiz Khalifa's "Work Hard, Play Hard" and Rihanna's "Diamonds".

Music video
A music video to accompany the release of "Turn Around" was first released onto YouTube on 9 September 2012 at a total length of four minutes and three seconds and Britt Nilsson appear in the clip. It was filmed in Los Angeles, California, and was directed by Colin Tilley.

Critical reception
Lewis Corner of Digital Spy gave the song a positive review stating:

"Turn around, open your eyes/ Look at me now/ Turn around, girl I've got you/ We won't fall down," he promises his (hopefully more appreciative) new beau over a mix of euphoric Italo piano riffs and pacing house beats, all worthy of the air-grabbing displayed in the accompanying music video. With mentor and pal Ne-Yo joining him on the track and another pop hit to add to his blossoming collection, we're sure being ditched over the internet will safely remain in Conor's past. .

Track listing

Credits and personnel
 Lead vocals – Conor Maynard, NeYo
 Producers – Stargate, Benny Blanco, Plan J
 Lyrics – Mikkel S. Eriksen, Tor Erik Hermansen, Benjamin Levin, Shaffer Smith
 Label: Parlophone

Chart performance

Weekly charts

Year-end charts

Release history

References

2012 singles
2012 songs
Conor Maynard songs
Ne-Yo songs
Parlophone singles
Songs written by Tor Erik Hermansen
Songs written by Mikkel Storleer Eriksen
Songs written by Ne-Yo
Songs written by Benny Blanco
Song recordings produced by Stargate (record producers)
Song recordings produced by Benny Blanco
Music videos directed by Colin Tilley